Tremayne Stephens is a former professional American football NFL player who played running back for two seasons for the San Diego Chargers and one season for the Indianapolis Colts. He was selected as a free agent in 1998 to San Diego from North Carolina State University where he amassed 3,558 yards rushing and 23 touchdowns, which both still rank third in school history. He had his first start his rookie season against the Oakland Raiders where he finished with 17 carries for 74 yards. He was selected as an AFC Alternate Kickoff Returner in 1998 when he averaged 27.9 yards per kickoff return.

References

1976 births
American football running backs
San Diego Chargers players
NC State Wolfpack football players
Living people
Sportspeople from Greenville, South Carolina
Players of American football from South Carolina